Life is a Circus is a 1960 British comedy film directed by Val Guest and starring Bud Flanagan, Teddy Knox, Jimmy Nervo, Jimmy Gold and Charlie Naughton of the Crazy Gang. The screenplay concerns a down-on-its-luck circus that uses an Aladdin's Magic Lamp to try to save their business.

The film is generally considered inferior to the Crazy Gang's previous screen appearances.

Cast
 Bud Flanagan as Bud 
 Teddy Knox as Sebastian 
 Jimmy Nervo as Cecil 
 Jimmy Gold as Goldie 
 Charlie Naughton as Charlie 
 Eddie Gray as Eddie 
 Chesney Allen as Ches 
 Shirley Eaton as Shirley Winter 
 Michael Holliday as Carl Rickenbeck 
 Lionel Jeffries as Genie 
 Joseph Tomelty as Joe Winter 
 Eric Pohlmann as Rickenbeck 
 Harold Kasket as Hassan 
 Edwin Richfield as Driver 
 Peter Glaze as Hand #1 
 Sam Kydd as Removal man 
 Geoffrey Denton as Policeman

References

External links

1960 films
British comedy films
1960s English-language films
CinemaScope films
Films directed by Val Guest
Works based on Aladdin
Circus films
1960 comedy films
Films set in England
1960s British films